The Naviglio Pavese is one of the canals making up the Navigli system in Lombardy, Italy.

Construction started in 1564, but was interrupted 20 years later just outside Milan due to technical problems: the lock there is still called Conca Fallata, which in Italian means "Failed Lock". Building resumed at the beginning of the 19th century and was completed in 1819.

The canal was finally closed to navigation in the 1960s, but work has recently started to restore it back to full navigation, a link in the project to connect Switzerland to Venice by inland waterway.

Geography of Milan
Canals in Lombardy
Waterways of Italy
1564 establishments in Italy
1960s disestablishments in Italy
Transport in Lombardy
Canals opened in 1819